Varda is a small settlement in the Municipality of Sveti Jurij v Slovenskih Goricah in northeastern Slovenia. The area is part of the traditional region of Styria. It is now included in the Drava Statistical Region.

Two small roadside chapel-shrines in the settlement date to 1865 and the early 20th century.

A number of Roman period burial mounds have been identified near the settlement.

References

External links
Varda at Geopedia

Populated places in the Municipality of Sveti Jurij v Slovenskih Goricah